Table tennis at the 2000 Summer Paralympics consisted of thirty singles and team events.

Competitors were divided into eleven classes according to the extent of their disability with lower numbered classes corresponding to more severe disabilities. Classes one through five competed in wheelchairs and classes six through ten competed while standing.

Medal table

Participating nations

Events

Men's events

Women's events

References 

 

2000 Summer Paralympics events
2000
2000 in table tennis